Sheil is a surname. Notable people with the surname include:

Ainslie Sheil (born 1933), rugby union player who represented Australia
Bernard James Sheil (1888–1969), Auxiliary Roman Catholic Bishop of Chicago
Edward Sheil (1851–1915), Irish nationalist politician
Ernie Sheil (1906–1970), Australian rules footballer
Glen Sheil (1929–2008), Australian politician representing the National Party
Sir John Sheil (born 1938), Lord Justice of Appeal in Northern Ireland from 2005 to 2007
Kate Lyn Sheil, American independent film actress
Kate Sheil, Australian stage and television actress
Laurence Sheil (1815–1872), Irish Franciscan friar, third Roman Catholic Bishop of Adelaide
Martha Sheil, American operatic soprano
Norman Sheil (1932–2018), racing cyclist
Richard Lalor Sheil (1791–1851), Irish politician, writer and orator
Wally Sheil (1929–2002), American education administrator and politician from Jersey City, New Jersey

See also
Seil
Sheila

References